Thomas Benton Howard (August 10, 1854 – November 10, 1920) was a United States Navy officer who served as commander in chief of the U.S. Pacific Fleet prior to United States' entry into World War I.

Early life and education
Howard was born in the Illinoisan town of Galena in 1854 and was educated in the public schools. In 1868, through President Ulysses S. Grant, who spent the summer of that year in Galena, he was appointed to the US Naval Academy. Grant knew Howard's father well and his wife and Howard's mother were also friends when both lived in St. Louis.

Howard came from a military family, as his father, Bushrod Brush Howard, was a captain in the Mexican War. Bushrod Howard, in the early days of the Civil War, commanded Company I, 19th Illinois Infantry Regiment and was killed along with more than one hundred other men of the regiment in a railroad accident at Beaver Creek Bridge on the Ohio and Mississippi Railroad. Howard's mother was Elizabeth Mackay Howard, daughter of Helen and Aeneas Mackay, a United States Army officer stationed at Jefferson Barracks, St. Louis, as was also her maternal grandfather, Captain Thomas Legate. Captain Legate moved to Galena, Illinois in 1828 as Superintendent of the lead mines.

Career

As a cadet in the academy, Howard was often, by special invitation, a guest at the White House, and was usually appointed Grant's aide whenever the President visited Annapolis. Howard graduated at the top of his class in 1873 and was promoted to ensign in 1874. As captain of Ohio, he sailed around the world with the Great White Fleet in 1908–1909.

In January 1914, Howard was appointed commander in chief of the U.S. Pacific Fleet. The same year, during the Mexican Revolution, Howard commanded a squadron of American vessels in the Gulf of California. Their mission was to observe the Topolobampo naval campaign. Three of Howard's warships were present at the Fourth Battle of Topolobampo. When the Marines established camp for the second time on San Diego's North Island, they named it Camp Howard, in his honor. In 1915, he became the fifth full admiral in the history of the U.S. Navy when the three commanders in chief of the Atlantic, Pacific, and Asiatic Fleets were each advanced to the temporary rank of full admiral. Upon relinquishing command of the Pacific Fleet in September 1915, Howard reverted to his permanent rank of rear admiral.

Dates of rank
 Midshipman – 31 May 1873
 Ensign – 16 July 1874
 Master – 13 January 1879
 Junior lieutenant – 3 March 1883
 Lieutenant – 7 November 1885
 Lieutenant commander – 3 March 1899
 Commander – unknown
 Captain – unknown
 Rear admiral – 14 November 1910
 Admiral – March 1915

Later life and death
Howard retired on August 10, 1916. He was Superintendent of the US Naval Observatory from March 31, 1917 to March 4, 1919. He died in Annapolis, Maryland on November 10, 1920.

Personal life
Howard is the father of Captain Douglas Legate Howard and great-grandfather of Vice Admiral Henry C. Mustin and second great-grandfather of Vice Admiral John Mustin.

References

Further reading
 
 
 
 The Captains of the Great White Fleet

External links
 Thomas Benton Howard Papers, 1869–1919 MS 209 held by Special Collection & Archives, Nimitz Library at the United States Naval Academy

1854 births
1920 deaths
United States Naval Academy alumni
United States Navy admirals
People from Galena, Illinois
History of the Gulf of California
Military personnel from Illinois